Richard Arnold may refer to:

 Richard Arnold (chronicler) (died c. 1521), English antiquary and chronicler
 Richard Arnold (executive) (born 1971), British accountant and director at Manchester United
 Richard Arnold (general) (1828–1882), Major General in the American Civil War
 Richard Arnold (judge) (born 1961), British judge
 Richard Arnold (politician) (born 1959), German politician
 Richard Arnold (presenter) (born 1969), British television presenter and personality
 Richard Alexander Arnold, professor of English at Alfaisal University 
 Richard R. Arnold (born 1963), American astronaut
 Richard S. Arnold (1936–2004), Judge of U.S. Court of Appeals for the Eighth Circuit
 Richard Arnold (died 1647), English soldier executed after the Corkbush Field mutiny
 Richard Arnold, mayor of Savannah, Georgia, 1842–1843, 1851–1852, and 1859–1860

See also
 Rich Arnold (born 1945), Iowa State Representative